The 2016 Missouri Tigers football team (also called "Mizzou") represented the University of Missouri in the 2016 NCAA Division I FBS football season. The Tigers played their home games at Faurot Field in Columbia, Missouri, and competed in the Eastern Division of the Southeastern Conference (SEC). They were led by first-year head coach Barry Odom. They finished the season 4–8, 2–6 in SEC play to finish in last place in the East Division.

Schedule
Missouri announced its 2016 football schedule on October 29, 2015. The 2016 schedule consisted of 7 home and 5 away games in the regular season. The Tigers hosted SEC foes Arkansas, Georgia, Kentucky, and Vanderbilt, and travelled to Florida, LSU, South Carolina, and Tennessee.

The Tigers hosted three of its four of its non–conference games which were against Delaware State Hornets from the FCS Mid-Eastern Athletic Conference, Eastern Michigan Eagles from the Mid-American Conference, and Middle Tennessee from Conference USA. The Tigers played the West Virginia Mountaineers from the Big 12 Conference as an away game.

Schedule Source:

Game summaries

at West Virginia

Eastern Michigan

Georgia

Delaware State

at LSU

at Florida

Middle Tennessee

Kentucky

at South Carolina

Vanderbilt

at Tennessee

Arkansas

References

Missouri
Missouri Tigers football seasons
Missouri Tigers football